Linli is a county in Hunan Province, China, it is under the administration of the prefecture-level city of Changde. It is divided into eight towns and two townships under its jurisdiction, the county seat is Anfu Subdistrict.

Administrative divisions
Through the adjustment of township-level administrative divisions of Linli County in 2015 and 2017, Linli County has seven towns, two townships and two sub-districts under its jurisdiction. they are:

2 subdistricts
 Anfu Subdistrict
 Wangcheng Subdistrict, Linli County

7 towns
Hekou, Linli
Sheshiqiao
Sixingang
Taifu, Linli
Tingxuandu
Xin'an, Linli
Xiumei

2 townships
Fenghuo
Kemushan

Climate

Transportation 
The area is served by Linli railway station on the Shimen–Changsha railway.

References

 
County-level divisions of Hunan
Changde